Christoph Röhl (born 1967 in Brighton) is a British-German filmmaker.

Early life and education
Christoph Röhl was born in Brighton to an English father, the historian John C. G. Röhl, and a German mother Rosemarie von Berg. He read History and German at the University of Manchester achieving a First Class Double Honours Degree.

Career
Christoph Röhl studied film directing and scriptwriting at the Deutsche Film- und Fernsehakademie Berlin. His first short films received various international awards including the National German Film Award.

After a period directing films for the BBC and ITV, he was approached by Thomas Hoegh, a Norwegian investor and entrepreneur, to set up a film school in London. He took up the offer and co-founded the Met Film School, now located at Ealing Studios in London. Röhl was the school’s director for four years.

Röhl returned to Berlin to direct his first feature film, A Piece of Me (German: Ein Teil von mir), in 2007. The film received its premiere at the Shanghai Film Festival and was released in German cinemas in 2009. His next film was a documentary called We're Not The Only Ones (German: Und wir sind nicht die Einzigen). The film dealt with the child sex abuse scandal at the well-known Odenwaldschule. The film was nominated for a German TV Award in 2011 and won the Robert-Geisendörfer-Prize in 2012. In 2014 he directed the film The Chosen Ones (German: Die Auserwählten) with Ulrich Tukur and Julia Jentsch in the lead roles. It was nominated for the Prix Europa Award 2014 and won Best Film at the Zoom Festival in Barcelona.

In 2018 Röhl directed the docudrama Kaisersturz, which was broadcast on ZDF to coincide with the centenary of the abdication of Kaiser Wilhelm II and the end of the First World War. In the same year, Defender of the Faith (German: Verteidiger des Glaubens), a feature documentary about Cardinal Joseph Ratzinger's influence on the Catholic Church and the events leading to his historic resignation as Pope Benedict XVI in February 2013, was released in German cinemas. The film received its premier at the DOK.fest München. More than a mere portrait of Joseph Ratzinger, it is a portrayal of a whole system whose rigidity and inflexibility has led it into a cul-de-sac.

In 2014 he was presented with The World Childhood Foundation Award by Queen Sylvia of Sweden for "whose work to combat child abuse was recognized by the World Childhood Foundation".

Filmography (selection)
 2019 Defender of the Faith
 2018 Kaisersturz
 2014 The Chosen Ones (aka Die Auserwählten)
 2013 Die Kita Frage
 2011 We're not the Only Ones (aka Und wir sind nicht die Einzigen)
 2008 A Piece of Me (aka Ein Teil von mir)
 2006 Fast Learners
 2005 Act Your Age
 2002 Night & Day
 2000 Butterfly World
 2000 Close & True
 1998 Fivefortyfive
 1997 Der geklaute Spielplatz
 1997 Der Nullenschlucker
 1995 In Your Shoes

Awards
 2015: Gold World Medal, New York Festivals
 2014: Best Film, ZOOM Festival de Ficció Internacional TV, Barcelona
 2014: First Prize, Youth Jury, ZOOM Festival de Ficció Internacional TV, Barcelona
 2014: Prix Europa Television Prize Nomination
 2014: The World Childhood Foundation Award
 2012: Winner, Robert Geissendörfer Award
 2011: Nominierung für den Deutschen Fernsehpreis: Und wir sind nicht die Einzigen in der Sparte „Beste Dokumentation“
 2009: Jin Jue Award Nomination, Shanghai Int. Film Festival
 2009: Best Youth Film, Fünf Seen Filmfestival
 2009: Best Newcomer for actor Ludwig Trepte, Filmkunstfest M-V
 2009: DEFA Förderpreis, Max Ophüls Filmfestival
 2008: Eastman Kodak Prize Nomination, Hof International Film Festival
 1999: Audience Award, Filmfest Regensburg
 1999: Best Short Film, Filmfest Ludwigsburg
 1999: Friedrich Wilhelm Murnau Prize
 1996: Gold Plaque, Chicago International Film Festival
 1998: First Prize, VFF Young Talent Award, Munich International Festival of Film Schools
 1997: Erich Kästner Fernsehpreis
 1997: Adolf Grimme Prize Nomination
 1996: Mention Spéciale du Jury, Festival du Film Court de Brest (Brest European Short Film Festival)
 1996: German Film Prize in Silver
 1996: Special Mention of the Jury, Filmfestival Max Ophüls
 1996: Best Short Film, Max-Ophüls Short Film Prize
 1995: Jury Prize for Best Short Film, Munich International Festival of Film Schools

External links
 Official Website
 
 Website of Film "We’re not the Only Ones"
 Website of Met Film School

References 

1967 births
Living people
People from Brighton
British people of German descent
British filmmakers